The Nova Scotia Sport Hall of Fame was established in 1964, to honor outstanding athletes, teams and sport builders in the Canadian province of Nova Scotia. The facilities are located at the World Trade and Convention Centre in the provincial capital city of Halifax.

Notable inductees

 Marty Barry
 Fred S. Cameron
 Lyle Carter
 Pat Connolly
 James Creighton
 Sidney Crosby
 Buddy Daye
 Anne Dodge
 Hanson Dowell
 Norm Ferguson
 Stephen Giles
 Vince Horsman
 Don Loney
 Ronald MacDonald
 Al MacInnis
 Mike McPhee
 Carroll Morgan
 Bill O'Donnell
 Arnie Patterson
 Bruce Rainnie
 Tyrone Williams

References

Nova Scotia Sport Hall of Fame inductees

Sport in Halifax, Nova Scotia
Museums in Halifax, Nova Scotia
Sports museums in Canada
Halls of fame in Canada
All-sports halls of fame
Canadian sports trophies and awards
Awards established in 1964
1964 establishments in Nova Scotia
Nova Scotia awards